"One Day in Your Life" is a song by Canadian rock group 54-40. It was released as a single released from the band's 1987 album, Show Me. It was the band's first song to chart on Canada's singles Chart, peaking at No. 90 on the RPM chart in May, 1988. It is considered to be one of the band's signature songs.

Meaning
Neil Osborne explained the song as being about "putting your life in perspective", and that "Rather than getting down, there’s so much that you can convert into up."

References

External links

1988 singles
54-40 songs
1988 songs
Reprise Records singles
Songs written by Darryl Neudorf